Helene Næss (born 29 June 1991) is a Norwegian competitive sailor, born in Tønsberg. 

She won a gold medal in 49er FX at the 2018 49er & 49er FX European Championships, along with Marie Rønningen. She qualified to represent Norway at the 2020 Summer Olympics in Tokyo 2021, competing in 49erFX.

References

External links
 
 
 

 

1991 births
Living people
Norwegian female sailors (sport)
Olympic sailors of Norway
Sailors at the 2020 Summer Olympics – 49er FX
Sportspeople from Tønsberg